Emilio Exequiel Hernández Hernández (born 14 September 1984) is a Chilean former footballer who played as attacking midfielder or forward.

Career
Hernández began his career at Colo-Colo aged 12 in 1996, but after being released, he joined Universidad de Chile one year later, where was promoted to first-adult team in 2005.

In 2006, he was loaned to Everton for acquire more experience, returning in January 2007 to La U now coached by Salvador Capitano.

Following Capitano's period in the bench and caretaker Jorge Socías too, Hernández had rising-up performances under coach Arturo Salah. In 2009, he was a key player in  Torneo Apertura obtention under Sergio Markarián orders.

Because his good performances, on 24 July 2009, he joined Mexico's Cruz Azul for a three-year contract in a US$1.3 million fee.

After a poor performance at Cruz Azul, he moved to Argentinos Juniors in a one-year loan deal. He debuted in a 2–2 home draw with Boca Juniors and his first goal came the following week in a 6–3 away win over Lanús.

However, Hernández was a regular player in Borghi's starting lineup, being usually occupied as left winger and conforming an efficient attack alongside Ismael Sosa and Juan Mercier that led Bichos Colorados to win Torneo Clausura title, which was Emilio's first title outside Chile.

After a one-and-half season loan prolongation, he ended his contract with Cruz Azul and failed to continue at La Paternal, being released in December 2011.

Honours
Universidad de Chile
 Primera División de Chile (2): 2009 Clausura, 2012 Apertura

Argentinos Juniors
 Argentine Primera División (1): 2010 Clausura

Colo-Colo
 Primera División de Chile (1): 2014 Clausura

References

External links
 
 
 Primera División Argentina statistics at Futbol XXI 

1984 births
Living people
Footballers from Santiago
Chilean footballers
Chilean expatriate footballers
Chile international footballers
Universidad de Chile footballers
Everton de Viña del Mar footballers
Cruz Azul footballers
Argentinos Juniors footballers
Unión Española footballers
Colo-Colo footballers
Colo-Colo B footballers
Unión La Calera footballers
Coquimbo Unido footballers
San Martín de San Juan footballers
Municipal La Pintana footballers
Audax Italiano footballers
Deportes Melipilla footballers
Chilean Primera División players
Liga MX players
Argentine Primera División players
Segunda División Profesional de Chile players
Primera B de Chile players
Chilean expatriate sportspeople in Mexico
Chilean expatriate sportspeople in Argentina
Expatriate footballers in Mexico
Expatriate footballers in Argentina
Association football forwards
Association football midfielders